EBPO may refer to:
 Education Business Partnership, a British type of business organisation
 Euro (Cyrillic: ЕВРО, Greek: ΕΥΡΩ), the European common currency